Slaven Juriša (born 18 January 1992) is a Croatian footballer who currently plays for Tekstilac Odžaci.

Club career
On 3 March 2017, he joined Motor Lublin on loan until the end of the 2016–17 season.

After less than a half year at Serbian club FK Mladost Omoljica, Juriša joined Polish club Legionovia Legionowo in the summer 2018. He played 14 games and scored two goals in all competitions, before he left and joined FK Dinamo Pančevo at the end of January 2019.

He was part of the "Croats from Serbia" team at the 2016 EUROPEADA games.

References

External links

1992 births
Living people
Sportspeople from Pančevo
Croats of Vojvodina
Association football midfielders
Croatian footballers
HNK Cibalia players
NK Marsonia players
Górnik Łęczna players
Motor Lublin players
Legionovia Legionowo players
FK Dinamo Pančevo players
Ekstraklasa players
Croatian expatriate footballers
Expatriate footballers in Poland
Croatian expatriate sportspeople in Poland
Expatriate footballers in Serbia
Croatian expatriate sportspeople in Serbia